The A B Wood Medal is a prize awarded annually by the Institute of Acoustics for "distinguished contributions to the application of underwater acoustics".  The prize, named after Albert Beaumont Wood, is presented in alternate years to European and North American scientists.

Recipients
Source: Institute of Acoustics

See also

 List of physics awards

References

Physics awards
British science and technology awards